Horațiu Pașca (born 6 May 1981) is a Romanian former handball player and current coach.

Achievements

Manager  
Gloria Bistrița
Liga Națională:
Bronze Medalist: 2019

U Jolidon Cluj
Supercupa României:
Finalist: 2013

References

1981 births
Living people
Romanian male handball players  
Sportspeople from Bistrița